The 2019 Budapest FIA Formula 3 round was a motor racing event held on 3 and 4 August 2019 at the Hungaroring, Mogyoród, Pest, Hungary. It was the fifth round of the 2019 FIA Formula 3 Championship, and ran in support of the 2019 Hungarian Grand Prix.

Classification

Qualifying 
The Qualifying session took place on 2 August 2019, with Christian Lundgaard scoring pole position.

Race 1

Race 2

See also 

 2019 Hungarian Grand Prix
 2019 Budapest Formula 2 round

References

External links 
Official website

|- style="text-align:center"
|width="35%"|Previous race:
|width="30%"|FIA Formula 3 Championship2019 season
|width="40%"|Next race:

Budapest
Budapest Formula 3